Krzesinówek  is a settlement in the administrative district of Gmina Kutno, within Kutno County, Łódź Voivodeship, in central Poland.

References

Villages in Kutno County